The New South Wales XPT (short for eXpress Passenger Train) is a class of diesel-powered passenger trains built by Comeng and ABB Transportation. Based on the British Rail designed Intercity 125 High Speed Train, each XPT set is made up of two XP Power Cars in a push-pull formation coupled to between four and seven carriages. The first sets entered service under the State Rail Authority in 1982 and now operate under NSW TrainLink, running on long-distance regional and interstate North Coast, Main Western and Main Southern lines throughout New South Wales and interstate into Victoria and Queensland.

History

Development 
Improving public transport was a major issue in the 1976 State Election in New South Wales and one of the commitments of the incoming Wran Government was to buy new rolling stock for country rail services.

In January 1978, the Public Transport Commission invited tenders for 25 high-speed railcars similar to the Prospector railcars delivered by Comeng to the Western Australian Government Railways in 1971. The tender allowed bidders to suggest alternative types of high-speed train. Comeng submitted a tender for a train based on the British Rail designed High Speed Train which had entered service in the United Kingdom in October 1976. In August 1979, Comeng was announced as the successful bidder and although the tender had called for 100 vehicles, by the time the contract was signed in March 1980, the order was only for 30, 10 power cars and 20 carriages, enough to form four five-carriage trains with two spare power cars.

A different light cluster was fitted along with three high-beam spotlights mounted to the roof. The passenger trailer cars were based on a Budd design, with the British Rail Mark 3 trailers considered unsuitable.

In service 

The first power car and trailer commenced testing with a stainless steel luggage van in August 1981. The initial XPT livery was red, black and orange with InterCity XPT signwriting on the power cars. It was also known as the "Supertrain". On a demonstration run to Albury on 6 September 1981 the XPT set a new Australian rail speed record of 183 km/h between Table Top and Gerogery in southern NSW, breaking that set by the Western Australian Government Railways' Prospector railcar in 1971. On a test run to Albury on 18 September 1992 the XPT reached 193 km/h between Table Top and Yerong Creek. 200 km/h was the target speed. This record was broken by Queensland Rail's Electric Tilt Train in May 1999.

The first full test XPT set ran in January 1982. The four sets entered service on the Central West XPT to Dubbo in April 1982, the Mid North Coast XPT to Kempsey in May 1982 and the Riverina XPT to Albury in August 1982.

In 1983, a further five power cars and 15 trailers were ordered. These allowed the Canberra XPT to commence in August 1983 followed by the Northern Tablelands XPT to Glen Innes and Tenterfield (2 times per week only) in June 1984. The XPT cut 50 minutes off the trip between Sydney and Canberra. By tightening up the diagrams, an overnight South XPT to Albury was introduced, but cancelled in June 1985 due to low patronage. In 1985 an additional 12 trailer carriages were ordered to allow six sets of 7 carriages to be formed. From October 1985, the Mid North Coast XPT to Kempsey ceased, being replaced by the Holiday Coast XPT to Grafton. The Northern Tablelands XPT also was cut back to Armidale and only ran on alternate days with a HUB/RUB set operating on the other days.

Initially the XPT carried a fare surcharge compared to parallel locomotive hauled services; however this was abolished from May 1985.

It was proposed to extend operations to Melbourne with costs to be shared with V/Line. A five-carriage promotional train ran to Melbourne on Sunday 17 February 1985, running four free return shuttles to Tullamarine Loop. Crew training commenced on the North East line between Albury and Benalla in July 1985 with services scheduled to commence on 3 August, however agreement could not be reached with the Australian Federated Union of Locomotive Employees over crewing and the plan was shelved. Another promotional train ran to Melbourne in November 1990, with the consist XP2012–XDH2111–XDR2156–XD2219–XD2215–XFH2105–XP2008.

Following the election of the Greiner Government in March 1988, consultants Booz Allen Hamilton were commissioned to prepare a report into NSW rail services. On purely economic grounds, the report recommended closing all country passenger services as they were judged unviable; however this was not politically acceptable. If services were to be maintained, the report recommended operating a reduced rail service, all with XPTs.

In February 1990, the Brisbane Limited and Pacific Coast Motorail were withdrawn and replaced by XPT services to Brisbane and Murwillumbah. To provide rolling stock for these, the Canberra XPT was withdrawn and replaced by a locomotive hauled train and the Northern Tablelands Express was truncated to become a day return service to Tamworth.

In June 1990, the government announced that it would purchase a fleet of Xplorers to reintroduce services to Armidale and Moree. When these were introduced in October 1993 the Northern Tablelands XPT ceased and the stock replaced a locomotive hauled set on a service to Grafton.In October 1990, the government announced that eight sleeper carriages would be ordered for use on overnight services to Brisbane, Murwillumbah and Melbourne. These were included in an order placed with ABB Transportation, Dandenong in 1991 for four power cars and 13 trailers that was jointly funded by the New South Wales and Victorian governments. At the same time the earlier stock was repainted in CountryLink livery.

In November 1993, XPTs replaced locomotive hauled stock on the overnight Sydney/Melbourne Express. In December 1994 an XPT daylight service to Melbourne was introduced by extending the Riverina XPT from Albury.

In 1995, CountryLink trialled three Swedish Railways X2000 tilting train carriages. After conducting a statewide tour in March, they were used on Canberra services from 23 April until 18 June 1995 with modified XPT power cars XP2000 and XP2009.

Since 2003, an XPT has operated a service each January to Parkes for the Parkes Elvis Festival. With the closure of the Murwillumbah line, the XPT service was cut back to Casino from May 2004. In October 2013, with a set isolated west of Lithgow by bushfires, it was deployed on the Outback Xplorer service to Broken Hill.

Fleet (XP power cars) 
A total of 19 XP power cars were built. These locomotives were originally powered by a Paxman Valenta 12RP200L engine with a single turbocharger. These were replaced from June 2000 by Paxman VP185 12-cylinder, diesel engines with four low-pressure turbochargers and two high-pressure turbochargers boasting  that had been successfully used by some British Rail High Speed Trains since 1994. Traction equipment was manufactured in England by Brush Traction of Loughborough.

Power cars comprise five main compartments at the platform level. At the front is the drivers' cab, followed by the clean air compartment, engine room, cooling group, and compressor room at the rear of the locomotive.

The State Rail Authority named the XP power cars after destinations that the XPT served; these were shown in cursive script or with the logo of the relevant area on the cab sides. Names were occasionally altered; the table below shows the final names (removed circa 2000-2005), with earlier names in brackets.

These were:

XP2000–XP2014 were built by Comeng, Granville with XP2015–XP2018 built by ABB Transportation, Dandenong.

Accidents and incidents 
On 3 May 1991, an XPT locomotive derailed at Henty near the New South Wales-Victorian border, injuring the driver and six passengers.

On 27 January 2001, an XPT collided with a car on a level crossing in the Gerogery level crossing accident. Five people in the car were killed, and the train was derailed.

On 20 February 2020, a Sydney to Melbourne bound XPT derailed at around 7:45 pm in the Wallan derailment, killing the train's driver and pilot and injuring twelve.

Replacement 
In October 2016, the NSW government announced the XPTs would be replaced as part of the NSW TrainLink Regional Train Project. A contract with CAF was signed February in 2019, with the XPTs to be replaced with bi-mode Civity trains in 2023.

Services 
The XPT fleet is currently used on services from Sydney to Grafton, Casino, Brisbane, Dubbo and Melbourne.

Operating cycle 
The Dubbo set is captive and operates a daily return service. The other seven sets rotate on a seven-day repeating cycle as follows:
Day 1: 07:42 Sydney to Melbourne arrives 18:30, forms 19:50 Melbourne to Sydney
Day 2: arrives Sydney 06:58, forms 11:41 Sydney to Grafton arrives 22:15
Day 3: 05:15 Grafton to Sydney arrives 15:45, forms 20:42 to Melbourne
Day 4: arrives in Melbourne 07:30, forms 08:30 to Sydney arrives 19:59
Day 5: 07:08 Sydney to Casino arrives 18:41, forms 19:30 Casino to Sydney
Day 6: arrives Sydney 07:01, forms 14:41 Sydney to Brisbane
Day 7: arrives Brisbane 04:53, forms 05:55 Brisbane to Sydney arrives 20:10

Between each duty in Sydney, trains are serviced at the XPT Service Centre south of Sydenham station. This pattern has led to the XPT being one of the most utilised train fleets worldwide with only three significant periods of downtime in the cycle. This includes one overnight stabling in Grafton, between days 2 and 3, and two overnight stablings in Sydney, between days 4 and 5, and days 7 and 1.

New South Wales XPT carriage stock 

The original XPT carriages were refurbished in 1992/93 including a repaint in CountryLink livery. All were refurbished again between 2005 and 2008.

Fleet 

8 XAM Sleeping cars
10 XL First class saloon cars
9 XBR First class saloon/buffet cars
25 XF Economy class saloon cars
9 XFH Economy class saloon/luggage cars

Formations 
Initially, all services operated with five carriage sets. Following the purchase of extra carriages, this was increased to seven. In 1998, each set was reduced to six carriages. In 2001, all were reduced to five carriages outside of school holiday periods. Today, XPTs operate with four carriages to Dubbo (formed from the country end as XL, XBR, XF and XFH), and five (formed from the country end as XAM, XL, XBR, XF and XFH) on the North Coast and Melbourne services, with six during peak times when an extra XF is added (formed from the country end as XAM, XL, XBR, XF, XF and XFH) The Dubbo set can operate with one power car if required, with the power car turned at its destination.

Carriage coding, features and numbers are as follows:

The XPT fleet is maintained at the XPT Service Centre, a purpose built depot south of Sydenham station within the confines of the Meeks Road Triangle. All work is performed here except for wheel reprofiling which is performed on a wheel lathe at Flemington Maintenance Depot.

Potential export sale 
In 1986, agreement was reached to build a fleet of XPTs for the State Railway of Thailand. The negotiations were sufficiently advanced for the Prime Minister of Thailand to announce it on television, however the Australian Department of Trade withdrew its support at the last moment and the deal fell through.

References

External links 

 Specifications and technical diagrams
 Carriage information

External links 

Commonwealth Engineering locomotives
CountryLink
Interstate rail in Australia
Night trains of Australia
NSW TrainLink
Railway locomotives introduced in 1981
Rolling stock of New South Wales
Diesel multiple units with locomotive-like power cars